Goodnight, Charlene is a 2017 American crime thriller film directed by Chris Zuhdi, starring Zuhdi, Melanie San Millan, Daniel Ross Owens, Marissa Woolf and Chris Messersmith.

Cast
 Chris Zuhdi as Charlie Potter
 Melanie San Millan as Charlene
 Daniel Ross Owens as Billy
 Marissa Woolf as Rebecca
 Chris Messersmith as Mr. Flynn

Reception
Bobby LePire of Film Threat gave the film a score of 5 out of 10 and wrote that while "decently directed, beautifully lit, and most of the cast are do well all things considered", "two of the leads are quite dull, the script is trying too hard to be duplicitous, and winds up going nowhere all that compelling."

Noel Murray of the Los Angeles Times wrote that the film "doesn’t just look cheap", it "looks like most of it was shot in the same under-lighted room, with different wall decorations."

References

External links
 
 

American crime thriller films
2017 crime thriller films